The 1948 United States presidential election in Virginia took place on November 2, 1948, throughout the 48 contiguous states. Voters chose 11 representatives, or electors to the Electoral College, who voted for president and vice president.

Virginia voted for the Democratic nominee, incumbent President Harry S. Truman, over the Republican nominee, New York Governor Thomas E. Dewey and South Carolina Governor Strom Thurmond, who received the nomination of the States’ Rights Democratic Party.

, this is the last election in which the 5th congressional district has supported a Democratic presidential candidate. It is also the last election when Hanover County, King William County, Lancaster County, Middlesex County and Orange County have supported a Democratic Presidential nominee. Chesterfield County and Lynchburg City would not vote Democratic again at a presidential level until 2020, Henrico County not until 2008, Albemarle County and Danville City not until 2004, Prince Edward County not until 1996 and Amelia County not until 1976. This was also the last time until 2012 that Virginia voted for a different candidate than Indiana.

Results

Results by county

Notes

References

Virginia
1948
1948 Virginia elections